KHOZ (900 AM) is a radio station licensed to Harrison, Arkansas, United States. It carries a classic country format. The station is currently owned by Paul Coates and Mike Huckabee, through licensee Ozark Mountain Media Group, LLC.

On January 6, 2019, KHOZ changed their format from adult standards to classic country, branded as "Bootz 94.9" (simulcast on FM translator K235CE 94.9 FM Harrison).

Previous logo

References

External links

Classic country radio stations in the United States
HOZ
Harrison, Arkansas
1946 establishments in Arkansas
Radio stations established in 1946